Dwayne Parish is an American poet. He was born in Fairfield, California on Travis Air Force Base and grew up in Vallejo, California. He moved to Richmond in 1992. At age 55, he was named the first poet laureate of Richmond, California in 2012. He prefers to write in the acrostic form. Parish also served on the Richmond Arts & Culture Commission. Parish was succeeded as poet laureate by Donté Clark, Lincoln Bergman, and Brendan Quintanilla, who served concurrently.

See also 

 List of municipal poets laureate in California

References

American male poets
Living people
People from Richmond, California
Writers from Vallejo, California
Year of birth missing (living people)
Place of birth missing (living people)
Municipal Poets Laureate in the United States
African-American poets
People from Fairfield, California
21st-century African-American people
African-American male writers